Patthar Ke Sanam (Hindustani: पत्थर के सनम,  "hard-hearted lover") is a 1967 Indian Hindi-language movie. Produced by the Nadiadwalas, the film is directed by Raja Nawathe. It stars Manoj Kumar, Waheeda Rehman, Mumtaz, Pran, Mehmood, Lalita Pawar and Aruna Irani. The movie features many hit songs of the era, composed by the legendary Laxmikant Pyarelal and veteran lyricist Majrooh Sultanpuri, such as the ever-haunting Patthar Ke Sanam, rendered in the voice of Mohammad Rafi. The film stood ninth in the Box-Office Top Ten List of 1967.

Plot
The story revolves around two friends, Meena and Taruna. Meena lives a wealthy lifestyle along with her widowed dad, Thakur, in a small town in India. Taruna is her assistant as well as her best friend. Meena, while coming to her village from town, meets Rajesh, who teases her. When Meena's father hires a new manager, she learns that he is the same person she met on the train. She, along with Taruna, try to tease Rajesh by pretending to be in love with him. He finds out and pretends that he has fallen in love with both. As a result, both women end up falling in love with him for real, and Thakur is ready to permit Meena to wed him. Meena makes it clear that she wants Rajesh for herself and reminds Taruna that she had been engaged to their manager, Lala Bhagatram, when Taruna was a child. Lala Bhagatram is a very nasty man, who keeps reminding Taruna in public that he will marry as per the childhood promise. Then Rajesh is assaulted by some men and his mother, Shanti, looks after him. When Thakur sees her, he remembers that he had murdered her husband for all the wealth. Shanti hassles with a secret, that Meena is actually her daughter and Rajesh is Thakur's son. She wants them to get married so that she can be the owner of all the wealth again. Shanti begs Taruna to go away from Rajesh or else her plan will fail. Taruna agrees and pretends she doesn't love Rajesh. But Rajesh only loves Taruna and is emotionally hurt. Taruna can't take this anymore and decides to kill herself. Haria - a childish mentally challenged person reveals that she is not dead, but Lala Bhagatram has kept her in captivity. Rajesh goes and fights all the goons including Lala Bhagatram, but is beaten by them. Gauri and Taruna are transferred somewhere else with someone watching them constantly. Gauri's tied hands are freed by Taruna by cleverly avoiding the watchful eyes of the goons. Gauri jumps from the window and informs Rajesh. Rajesh goes and frees Taruna. In this fighting, Meena dies, Lala Bhagatram is killed by Thakur and Thakur is taken in custody. Shanti wants to leave, but Rajesh and Taruna insist that she stay with them. Haria and Gauri marry as well.

Cast
Waheeda Rehman as Taruna
Manoj Kumar as Rajesh
Mumtaz as Meena Thakur
Mehmood as Haria 'Rajendra Kumar'
Lalita Pawar as Shanti
Ramayan Tiwari as Thakur (as Tiwari)
Raj Mehra as Shyamlal
Pran as Lala Bhagatram
Mumtaz Begum as Haria's mother / Thakur's maidservant
Jankidas as Mr. Poojari (as Jankidass)
N.K. Misra as (as the Late N.K. Misra)
Aruna Irani as Gauri
Uma Dutt as Man in purple turban (member of the Panch)
Maqbool (as Muqbool)

Soundtrack

The soundtrack of Patthar Ke Sanam is composed by the duo Laxmikant–Pyarelal with lyrics by Majrooh Sultanpuri. The music album was released on vinyl lp by His Master's Voice in 1967, and consisted of 7 songs sung by singers Mukesh, Mohammad Rafi, Lata Mangeshkar and Asha Bhosle.

References

External links
 
 Cast & Crew Details at bollywoodhungama

1967 films
1960s Hindi-language films
Films scored by Laxmikant–Pyarelal
Films directed by Raja Nawathe